Hedong is a town of Lianshan Zhuang and Yao Autonomous County in northwestern Guangdong province, China, located about  southeast of the border with Hunan and  north of the county seat. , it has four villages under its administration.

See also
List of township-level divisions of Guangdong

References

Township-level divisions of Guangdong
Lianshan Zhuang and Yao Autonomous County